Telford Taylor (February 24, 1908 – May 23, 1998) was an American lawyer and professor. Taylor was known for his role as lead counsel in the prosecution of war criminals after World War II, his opposition to McCarthyism in the 1950s, and his outspoken criticism of American actions during the Vietnam War.

With the US Army, Taylor served with the Military Intelligence Corps during WWII, and reached the rank of brigadier general in 1946, following the war. During the prosecution of Axis war criminals, he served as lead counsel for the prosecution in the 12 subsequent Nuremberg trials before US military courts, after serving as assistant to Robert H. Jackson in the initial trial before the International Military Tribunal.

Following the Nuremberg trials, Taylor opened a private law practice, but remained politically active.

Background

Taylor was born on February 24, 1908, in Schenectady, New York.  His parents were John Bellamy Taylor (a relative of Edward Bellamy) and Marcia Estabrook Jones. He attended Williams College and Harvard Law School, where he received his law degree in 1932.

Career

Early career
During the 1930s, Taylor worked for several government agencies.  By 1935, he provided legal counsel (assisted by Max Lowenthal among others) to a subcommittee of the Senate Interstate Commerce Committee chaired by Burton K. Wheeler and whose members included the newly elected Harry S. Truman. In 1940, he became general counsel for the Federal Communications Commission.

World War II and Nuremberg

Following the outbreak of World War II, Taylor joined Army Intelligence as a Major on October 5, 1942, leading the American group at Bletchley Park that was responsible for analyzing information obtained from intercepted German communications using ULTRA encryption. He was promoted to lieutenant colonel in 1943 and visited England, where he helped negotiate the 1943 BRUSA Agreement. He was  promoted to full colonel in 1944, and was assigned to the team of Robert H. Jackson, which helped work out the London Charter of the International Military Tribunal (IMT), the legal basis for the Nuremberg Trials.

At the Nuremberg Trials, he initially served as an assistant to Chief Counsel Robert H. Jackson and, in that function, was the US prosecutor in the High Command case. The indictment in that case called for the General Staff of the Army and the High Command of the German Armed Forces to be considered criminal organizations; the witnesses were several of the surviving German field marshals. Both organizations were acquitted.

When Jackson resigned his position as prosecutor after the first (and only) trial before the IMT and returned to the US, Taylor was promoted to brigadier general and succeeded him on October 17, 1946, as Chief Counsel for the remaining twelve trials before the US Nuremberg Military Tribunals. In these trials at Nuremberg, 163 of the 200 defendants who were tried were found guilty in some or all of the charges of the indictments.

While Taylor was not wholly satisfied with the outcomes of the Nuremberg Trials, he considered them a success because they set a precedent and defined a legal base for crimes against peace and humanity. In 1950, the United Nations codified the most important statements from these trials in the seven Nuremberg Principles.

McCarthyism and Vietnam

After the Nuremberg Trials, Taylor returned to civilian life in the United States, opening a private law practice in New York City. He became increasingly concerned with Senator Joseph McCarthy's activities, which he criticized strongly. In a speech at West Point in 1953, he called McCarthy "a dangerous adventurer," branded his tactics "a vicious weapon of the extreme right against their political opponents," and criticized President Dwight Eisenhower for not stopping McCarthy's "shameful abuse of Congressional investigatory power." He defended several victims of McCarthyism, alleged communists or perjurers, including labor leader Harry Bridges and Junius Scales. Although he lost these two cases (Bridges' sentence of five years in prison was later voided by the Supreme Court, and Scales' six-year sentence was commuted after one year), he remained unfazed by McCarthy's attacks on him, and responded by writing the book, Grand Inquest: The Story of Congressional Investigations, which was published in 1955.

In 1959, he served as a technical adviser and narrator on the television production, Judgment at Nuremberg.

In 1961 Taylor attended the Eichmann trial in Israel as a semiofficial observer and expressed concerns about the trial being held on a defective statute.

Taylor became a full professor at Columbia University in 1962, where he would be named Nash Professor of Law in 1974. In 1966, he was elected a Fellow of the American Academy of Arts and Sciences. He was one of very few professors there who refused to sign a statement issued by the Columbia Law School that termed the militant student protests at Columbia in 1968 as being beyond the "allowable limits" of civil disobedience. Taylor was very critical of the conduct of US troops in the Vietnam War, and in 1971 urged President Richard Nixon to set up a national commission to investigate the conflict. He strongly criticized the court-martial of Lieutenant William Calley, the commanding officer of the US troops involved in the My Lai massacre because it did not include higher-ranking officers.

Taylor regarded the 1972 bombing campaign targeting the North Vietnamese capital, Hanoi, as "senseless and immoral." He offered to describe and explain his views to CBS, but the network declined to air them because they considered them "too hot to handle.". In December 1972, he visited Hanoi along with musician and activist Joan Baez and others, among them was Michael Allen, the associate dean of the Yale Divinity School.

Taylor published his views in a book, Nuremberg and Vietnam: An American Tragedy, in 1970. He argued that by the standards employed at the Nuremberg Trials, US conduct in Vietnam and Cambodia was equally criminal as that of the Nazis during World War II. For that reason, he favored prosecuting US aviators who had participated in bombing missions over North Vietnam.

Later life

In 1976, Taylor, who had already been a visiting professor at Harvard and Yale Law School, accepted a new post at the Benjamin N. Cardozo School of Law at Yeshiva University, becoming a founding member of the faculty while continuing to teach at Columbia. His 1979 book, Munich: The Price of Peace, won the National Book Critics Circle Award for the "best work of general nonfiction". In the 1980s, he extended his legal activities into sports and became a "special master" for dispute resolution in the NBA.  His 700-page 1992 memoir of the Nuremberg trials (see bibliography) revealed how Nazi leader Hermann Göring had "cheated the hangman" by taking smuggled poison.

Taylor retired in 1994.

Personal life and death
Taylor married twice; first to Mary Ellen Walker in 1937. He was survived by their three children, Joan, Ellen, and John.

While serving at Bletchley Park, he had an affair with Christine Brooke-Rose, who later became a writer and critic but was then a British officer at Bletchley. The affair led to the end of Brooke-Rose's marriage, although Taylor's to Walker endured for some years thereafter.

In 1974 he married Toby Golick, having three children who all survived him, Benjamin, Samuel, and Ursula.

Taylor died age 90 on May 23, 1998, at the St. Luke's-Roosevelt Hospital in Manhattan after having suffered a stroke.

Decorations

Here is the list of his decorations:

Bibliography
Sword and Swastika: Generals and Nazis in the Third Reich, Simon & Schuster 1952; reprinted 1980. 
Grand Inquest: The Story of Congressional Investigations, Simon & Schuster 1955; reprinted 1974. 
The March of Conquest: The German Victories in Western Europe, 1940 (Great War Stories), Simon & Schuster 1958; reprinted 1991. 
The Breaking Wave: The Second World War in the Summer of 1940, Simon & Schuster 1967; 
Guilt, Responsibility and the Third Reich, Heffer 1970; 20 pages; 
Nuremberg and Vietnam: An American Tragedy, Times Books 1970; 
Perspectives on Justice, Northwestern University Press 1974; 
Courts of Terror: Soviet Criminal Justice and Jewish Emigration, Knopf 1976; 
Munich: The Price of Peace, Hodder & Staughton 1979; reprinted 1989. 
The Anatomy of the Nuremberg Trials: A Personal Memoir, Knopf 1992;

References
Main sources:

Ferencz, B.: Telford Taylor: Pioneer of International Criminal Law, Columbia Journal of Transnational Law, 37(3), 1999. URL last accessed 2006-12-12.
Telford Taylor from the Cardozo School of Law at the Yeshiva University.

Other sources:

Further reading:

Essays on the laws of war and war crimes tribunals in honor of Telford Taylor: Columbia Journal of Transnational Law, vol. 37(3)

External links
Taylor's presentation of the High Command case on April 1, 1946 at the Nuremberg Trial.
A short biography from Columbia University.
Telford Taylor When people kill a people, New York Times, March 28, 1982. "...In such an analysis, as far as wartime actions against enemy nationals are concerned, the Genocide Convention added virtually nothing to what was already covered ... by the internationally accepted laws of land warfare ...".
Guide to Telford Taylor Papers at the Rare Book and Manuscript Library of Columbia University

1908 births
1998 deaths
American anti–Vietnam War activists
20th-century American historians
American male non-fiction writers
American anti-fascists
American legal scholars
American legal writers
20th-century American memoirists
United States Army personnel of World War II
United States Army generals
Recipients of the Distinguished Service Medal (US Army)
Officers of the Order of the British Empire
Columbia University faculty
Fellows of the American Academy of Arts and Sciences
Franklin D. Roosevelt administration personnel
Harvard Law School alumni
Historians of New York (state)
Lawyers who have represented the United States government
New York (state) lawyers
Nuremberg trials
Military personnel from Schenectady, New York
Prosecutors of the International Military Tribunal in Nuremberg
Williams College alumni
Historians of World War II
Yeshiva University faculty
20th-century American male writers